James Lamont may refer to:
James Lamont (explorer) (1828–1913), Scottish explorer and politician
James Lamont (footballer) (1875–?), Scottish footballer
James Lamont (writer), British screenwriter and producer
James Lamont & Co, a shipbuilder and ship-repairer on the Clyde